Peter Joseph Smethurst (born August 8, 1940) is a South African retired professional soccer player who played as an inside forward in South Africa, England and Canada.

Career 
Smethurst played with Durban City F.C. in the National Football League. In 1959, he played in the Football League First Division with Blackpool F.C. In 1961, he played in the Eastern Canada Professional Soccer League with Hamilton Steelers. Throughout his tenure with Hamilton he played in six seasons and finished as the club's top goalscorer. On January 21, 1965, he signed a contract with New York Ukrainians in the German-American Soccer League, and returned to Hamilton for the remainder of the season.

Personal life 
His brother Derek was also a footballer in the North American Soccer League.

References 

Living people
1940 births
Sportspeople from Durban
South African soccer players
Association football forwards
National Football League (South Africa) players
English Football League players
Eastern Canada Professional Soccer League players
German-American Soccer League players
Durban City F.C. players
Blackpool F.C. players
Hamilton Steelers (ECPSL) players